The Frederickcross (German: "Friedrich Kreuz or Friedrich-Kreuz") was instituted in 1914 by the ruling Duke of Anhalt, Frederick II of Anhalt as a decoration not unlike the Iron Cross for merit in time of war.

There are three versions of the Frederickcross

 A bronze cross on a green ribbon with red borders for combatants.
 A bronze cross on a green ribbon with white borders for non-combatants.
 A cross as a brooch (in German a "steckkreuz") that was worn without a ribbon.

This cross pattée bore a crown on the upper arm and the date "1914" on the lower arm. In the central medallion is the monogram of the duke, two intertwined "F"'s.  The reverse is flat but the central medallion bears the text "Für Verdienst" (For Merit")

In 1918 the Anhalt monarchy fell and the decoration was abolished.

William II of Germany and Fieldmarshall Paul von Hindenburg wore this cross.

Recipients 

 Oswald Boelcke
 Felix Graf von Bothmer
 Franz Breithaupt
 Leopold Bürkner
 Gerhard Conrad (pilot)
 Karl Dönitz
 Friedrich II, Duke of Anhalt
 Paul Hausser
 Paul von Hindenburg
 Hans-Valentin Hube
 Oswald Lutz
 Friedrich von Rabenau
 Rupprecht, Crown Prince of Bavaria
 Wilhelm II, German Emperor

References

Orders, decorations, and medals of Anhalt
Awards established in 1914